Holy See–Peru relations are foreign relations between the Holy See and Peru.

History 
Both countries established diplomatic relations in 1859. Pope John Paul II made two pastoral visits. The first was in February 1985 and the second in May 1988. Pope Francis made one in January 2018.

Resident diplomatic missions

 Holy See has an apostolic nunciature in Lima.
 Peru has an embassy to the Holy See based in Rome.

See also 
 Roman Catholicism in Peru
 List of ambassadors of Peru to the Holy See

External links 
 Peruvian Ministry of Foreign Relations: CL Anniversary of bilateral relations with the Holy See (in Spanish only)
  Peruvian Ministry of Foreign Relations: direction of the Peruvian embassy to the Holy See
 Peruvian Ministry of Foreign Relations and Cult: direction of the Holy See’s embassy in Lima
 Acuerdo entre la Santa Sede y el Perú (in Spanish only)
 Conventio Inter Apostolicam Sedem et Peruvianum Rempublicam (in Latin only)

 
Peru
Bilateral relations of Peru